Branca Edmée Marques de Sousa Torres (Lisbon, 14 April 1899 - Lisbon, 19 July 1986) was a leading Portuguese specialist in the peaceful applications of nuclear technology who obtained a doctorate in Paris under the guidance of Marie Curie. Returning to Lisbon she founded the Radiochemistry Laboratory, where she continued her research for three decades.

Career

Marques' father died when she was just eight years old. After high school she joined the University of Lisbon. From there she graduated in Physics and Chemistry from the Faculty of Sciences. Having turned down a chance to do geological work in Angola, she taught at the faculty after her graduation in 1926, where she was the only woman carrying out teaching or research in chemistry. She married António Silva Sousa Torres (1876-1958), professor at the Faculty of Sciences of the University of Lisbon, but only on condition that she could go to Paris to study for a Doctorate.

Wishing to specialize in radioactivity, she applied for and received a grant from the National Education Board to study in 1931-32 at the Radium Institute in Paris (now the Curie Institute) on radioactivity topics. At her husband’s request she was accompanied by her mother. Impressed by Marques’ work, Curie wrote to the Portuguese government in 1932 requesting an extension of her fellowship but the grant was not renewed. However, the Institute found a way to allow her to continue with her research, which was later turned into work on a doctoral thesis.  In her first three years she worked under the guidance of Marie Curie and, in the last year, after Curie’s death, under the supervision of André-Louis Debierne. Her notes of classes given by Curie and Debierne form part of her valuable scientific estate. In 1935 she defended her doctoral thesis on Nouvelles recherches sur le fractionnement des sels de baryum radifère (New research on the fragmentation of radiferous barium salts) at the Sorbonne University. With the support of two Nobel Prize winners, Jean Baptiste Perrin and Frédéric Joliot-Curie, her Doctorate was awarded with three honourable mentions, the highest grade possible. She published her results in three articles in 1936 in the Journal de Chimie Physique and also published six articles in the Comptes rendus de l'Académie des Sciences of Paris. 

Despite being invited to continue her research career in Paris, Marques chose to return to Lisbon and resumed her activity at the Faculty of Sciences, where she developed research in the field of radioactivity. In 1936, she created the Radiochemistry Laboratory, which led, in 1953, to the formation of the Centre for Radiochemistry Studies of the Nuclear Energy Studies Commission. She continued to be the Director of the Centre until well after her formal retirement from the university. 

On her return to Lisbon Marques had been awarded a Doctorate in Physical-Chemical Sciences, on the strength of her French qualifications. She continued to do research on nuclear chemistry and radiochemistry and on the therapeutic applications of radioisotopes. She published regularly in Portuguese and international journals. However, despite her excellent qualifications, her career progression was relatively slow. The fact that she was a woman in a profession dominated by men appears to have been a major cause of this. She is quoted as saying that men considered it an insult to have to work with women. A contributory factor was that research was not a high priority in her university at that time: the laboratory she established was the first at the university. She finally became a full Professor only in 1966, when she was the first woman to obtain a Chair in Chemistry at a Portuguese university. Towards the end of her professional life she developed serious problems with her eyesight. In October 1967 she attended ceremonies in Paris to mark the 100th anniversary of the birth of Marie Curie. 

Branca Edmée Marques died on 19 July 1986 at the age of 87. In September 2009, the Lisbon City Council approved the name Branca Edmée Marques for a street in the university area as a way to honour her achievements.

References

1899 births
1986 deaths
20th-century chemists
20th-century physicists
20th-century women physicists
Portuguese chemists
Portuguese women scientists
Radioactivity
University of Paris alumni
University of Lisbon alumni